The Rooigembeek is a small stream in East Flanders, Belgium. It is a right tributary of the Wallebeek, which is a left tributary of the Scheldt. In its upper course, it is called Leedsebeek.

Its source is in Wortegem (Wortegem-Petegem municipality), west of Oudenaarde. It flows in northwestern direction, and flows into the Wallebeek in Asper (Gavere municipality), north of Oudenaarde.

Rivers of Belgium
Rivers of East Flanders